Meghan O'Gieblyn is an American writer, and essayist.

Life 

Meghan O'Gieblyn studied at Moody Bible Institute. She graduated from University of Wisconsin-Madison, with an MFA.

O'Gieblyn was a columnist for  Paris Review and Wired. Her work appeared in n+1. Three Penny Review, and Harper's.

Bibliography 

 Interior States (Anchor, 2018)
 God, Human, Animal, Machine (2021)
 
———————
Notes

References

External links 
 Official website

Living people
Year of birth missing (living people)
American essayists
Moody Bible Institute alumni
University of Wisconsin–Madison alumni
Wired (magazine) people